Regent Independent College is a private coeducational Sixth Form College providing A- Level courses located in London, England.

The college is inspected by the Independent Schools Inspectorate (ISI).

History 
The college first opened in 2000.

Curriculum 
The school offers  A Level courses in a range of subjects as well as offering retake courses, resits for students from other schools. The college also offers an on-line tutorial programme for pupils from overseas.

References

External links
 A-Levels and GCSE's success with Regent Independent College - official site

2000 establishments in England
Educational institutions established in 2000
Private co-educational schools in London
Private schools in the London Borough of Harrow